Duane Trucks (born December 28, 1988) is an American musician best known as the current drummer for Widespread Panic and Hard Working Americans.

Life and career
Duane Trucks was born on December 28, 1988, in Jacksonville, Florida. He began learning to play drums at the age of two and was given his first drum kit on his third birthday.

His first foray into being a professional musician was with bands led by Col. Bruce Hampton. He performed with Hampton in the Pharaoh Gummit beginning in the mid-2000s and became a founding member of one of Hampton's backup bands, The Quark Alliance, in 2007. He became a founding member of Flannel Church, a band that includes fellow Hampton collaborator A. J. Ghent, in 2010. They played a number of festivals including the 2013 Wanee Music Festival.

In 2013 Duane Trucks became a founding member of the supergroup Hard Working Americans which also features Dave Schools, Todd Snider and Neal Casal. He began filling in for founding Widespread Panic drummer Todd Nance in late 2014 when Nance stepped away from the band to deal with personal matters. He continued performing with the band as a fill in musician until February 2016 when it was announced that he would be replacing Nance as the band's official drummer. Despite not having been an official member of the band at the time, Trucks recorded all of the drum parts on Widespread Panic's 2015 album Street Dogs.

Personal life
Trucks comes from a musical family; his uncle was Allman Brothers Band drummer Butch Trucks and his older brother is Derek Trucks who is a former member of the Allman Brothers Band and currently performs with the Tedeschi Trucks Band. He is the great nephew of MLB pitcher Virgil Trucks.

He is married to Cameron Herring, the daughter of his Widespread Panic bandmate Jimmy Herring.

References

External links
Widespread Panic Official Website
Hard Working Americans Official Website

Living people
Widespread Panic members
Musicians from Jacksonville, Florida
American drummers
1988 births
21st-century American drummers
Hard Working Americans members
Trucks family